The 45th Golden Bell Awards (Mandarin:第45屆金鐘獎) was held on October 22, 2010 at Sun Yat-sen Memorial Hall in Taipei, Taiwan. The ceremony was broadcast live by TTV.

Winners and nominees
Below is the list of winners and nominees for the main categories.

References

External links
 Official website of the 45th Golden Bell Awards

2010
2010 television awards
2010 in Taiwan